

Players

Squad information

Transfers

In

Out

Statistics

Appearances and goals 

|-
! colspan=16 style=background:#dcdcdc; text-align:center| Goalkeepers 

|-
! colspan=17 style=background:#dcdcdc; text-align:center| Defenders 
 
 

 
 
|-
! colspan=16 style=background:#dcdcdc; text-align:center| Midfielders 
 

	
 	
|-
! colspan=16 style=background:#dcdcdc; text-align:center| Forwards

|-
! colspan=16 style=background:#dcdcdc; text-align:center| Players transferred out during the season
 
 

Last updated: 28 November 2022

References

External links 

 

FC Chernihiv
FC Chernihiv seasons
FC Chernihiv